Klaus Bonhoeffer (5 January 1901 – 23 April 1945) was a German jurist and resistance fighter against the Nazi régime who was executed after the July 1944 plot to kill Hitler.

Early life
Klaus Bonhoeffer was born in Breslau, Germany, now Wrocław, Poland, to Karl Bonhoeffer, a professor of psychiatry and neurology, and his wife Paula (née von Hase), as the third son in the Bonhoeffer family. His younger brother was the theologian Dietrich Bonhoeffer (4 February 1906 – 9 April 1945).

Education
As a child, he went to the Grunewald-Gymnasium in Berlin with Hans von Dohnanyi. He studied law at Heidelberg and received a doctorate for his thesis, "Workers' Committees as an Organ of the Workers' Coöperative" (Die Betriebsräte als Organ der Betriebsgenossenschaft). He also had further training in Berlin, at the University of Geneva, and in Amsterdam.

Marriage
On 3 September 1930, he wed Emmi Delbrück, who was Hans Delbrück's daughter, and Justus and Max Delbrück's sister.

Career
He worked as a lawyer and from 1935 as a legal adviser for Deutsche Luft Hansa, serving from 1937 to 1944 as chief syndic. This job took him on many business trips, even during the war.

World War II and death
In the years 1940–1944, he systematically forged contacts with various resistance groups working against the Nazi régime. Through his brother Dietrich, he had contacts with the church resistance, and through his brothers-in-law, Justus Delbrück, Dohnanyi and Rüdiger Schleicher, he had many contacts in the military resistance to Hitler, especially in the circle about Wilhelm Canaris in the Abwehr of the Oberkommando der Wehrmacht.

Through his wife's cousin Ernst von Harnack, he was connected to the social-democratic resistance. Klaus Bonhoeffer also led his colleague Otto John, among others, into the resistance. He used his travel opportunities to further the cause against the Nazis. He was dedicated to the plan to assassinate Hitler on 20 July 1944 and overthrow the government.

According to the detention book kept at the Lehrter Straße prison in Berlin, where the Gestapo had a special section for political prisoners, Bonhoeffer was arrested on 1 October 1944 and sentenced to death by the German "People's Court" (Volksgerichtshof) on 2 February 1945.

On the night of 22–23 April 1945, as Soviet troops were already reaching Berlin's eastern outskirts, he along with Rüdiger Schleicher and other prisoners was taken by a special squad from the RSHA to the exhibition grounds near the Lehrter Straße prison and killed with a gunshot wound to the neck. The only eyewitness to these murders was Herbert Kosney, who managed to move his head at the last moment so that the shot meant for his neck missed.

See also 
 List of members of the 20 July plot
 German Resistance
 Ernst Ludwig Heuss
 Emmi Bonhoeffer

References

External links 
 Dietrich Bonhoeffer – younger brother was the theologian and martyr.
 
 German Historical Museum
 Gedenkstätte Widerstand

1901 births
1945 deaths
Lawyers from Wrocław
People from the Province of Silesia
Executed members of the 20 July plot
German jurists
People condemned by Nazi courts
Protestants in the German Resistance
Executed German people
People executed by Nazi Germany by firearm
German people executed by Nazi Germany
Dietrich Bonhoeffer
Lufthansa people